The 2013–14 WNBL season was the 34th season of the Australian Women's National Basketball League (WNBL) competition since the league's establishment in 1981. A total of 9 teams contested the league. The regular season was played between 4 October 2013 and 15 February 2014, followed by a post-season involving the top five from 22 February 2014 until 9 March 2014. Bendigo Spirit finished the regular season as minor premiers and defeated Townsville Fire to claim back-to-back championships.

Broadcast rights were held by free-to-air network ABC. ABC broadcast one game a week, at 3pm at every standard time in Australia.

Sponsorship included Wattle Valley, entering its first year as league naming rights sponsor. Spalding provided equipment including the official game ball, with Champion supplying team apparel.

Team standings

Finals

Season award winners

References

 
2013–14 in Australian basketball
Australia
Basketball
Basketball